USS Evansville may refer to the following ships of the United States Navy:

, was a cargo ship acquired by the Navy 24 December 1917 and decommissioned 23 August 1919
, was launched 27 November 1943 and served under lend lease to the USSR and transferred to Japan on 31 October 1953

United States Navy ship names